is a Japanese manga artist who writes in the yaoi (boys' love) genre. Her major works include Love Mode and ZE. Shimiizu also worked on the Manga Dear+ Ze from 2004 to 2011 which was released in 11 books in English.

References

External links

 Yuki Shimizu manga at Media Arts Database 

Manga artists
Living people
Year of birth missing (living people)